The Thing is an album by saxophonist Mats Gustafsson, bassist Ingebrigt Håker Flaten and drummer Paal Nilssen-Love, who then took the album title as the name of their trio. The album was recorded in February 2000 and released that year by Crazy Wisdom, part of Universal.

Recording and music
The album was recorded on 10 and 11 February 2000, in Atlantis Studios, Stockholm. Four of the six tracks are interpretations of compositions by Don Cherry.

Releases
The album was first released in 2000 by Crazy Wisdon, part of Universal Group. It was also included in the box set Now and Forever in 2007.

Reception
The Thing received a positive review from The Penguin Guide to Jazz, which described it as "A great modern free-jazz record". The AllMusic reviewer summarised that "Gustafsson's furious and dense delivery receives great backing from Håker Flaten, who moves effortlessly from pizzicato to arco, and Nilssen-Love, who has the necessary energy to sustain the saxophonist's sonic onslaught", but criticised the performances on one track as "self-indulgence".

Track listing
"Awake Nu" (Don Cherry) – 5:06
"Mopti" (Cherry) – 11:35
"Cherryco" (Cherry) – 8:45
"Ode to Don" (Mats Gustafsson, Ingebrigt Håker Flaten, Paal Nilssen-Love) – 3:37
"The Art of Steve Roney – Smilin'" (Gustafsson, Flaten, Nilssen-Love) – 2:38
"Trans-Love Airways" (Cherry) – 19:17

Personnel
Mats Gustafsson – tenor sax, alto sax
Ingebrigt Håker Flaten – double bass
Paal Nilssen-Love – drums, percussion

References

2000 debut albums
Free jazz albums
The Thing (jazz band) albums